Itay or Itai is a given name. Notable people with the name include:

Itai Anghel, Israeli news correspondent
Itai Maggidi, Israeli long-distance runner
Itay Margalit, retired Israeli high jumper
Itay Segev (born 1995), Israeli basketball player
Itay Shechter (born 1987), Israeli footballer 
Itay Talgam, Israeli conductor and business consultant
Itay Tiran, Israeli stage and screen actor